Boerhavia erecta, commonly known as the erect spiderling or the erect boerhavia, is one of more than 100 species in the genus Boerhavia L.  Boerhavia erecta is native to the United States, Mexico, Central America and western South America, but now is cosmopolitan in tropical and subtropical regions. In Africa its distribution extends from West Africa, eastwards to Somalia and down to South Africa. It has recently been found in parts of Madagascar and Réunion. In Asia, it occurs in India, Java, Malaysia, the Philippines, China and the Ryukyu Islands.

As an adventive species Boerhavia erecta is not widely regarded as a serious weed or invasive threat; in fact its physical and pharmacological attributes suggest that it is potentially useful.

Description
Boerhavia erecta has a chromosome number 2n=52. It is a perennial herb similar to Boerhavia diffusa, but can be distinguished by the fact that erect spiderlings are straight, bear white and pink flowers and bear obconic, glabrous fruit.

Stem
Boerhavia erecta plants can survive considerable damage from grazing and fire because their stems produce perennating buds near the ground surface.

They generally are cylindrical without furrows or ridges. In colour they are green, commonly tinted with purple, and towards their upper regions they are slightly pubescent, being covered in short, soft hairs. The base of the stem however, is glabrous and woody.

Leaf
The leaves are somewhat fleshy. Their arrangement is opposite and unequal. The petioles of the leaf are pale green with a hint of purple. The blade of the leaf is ovate, ovate- lanceolate or lanceolate. The upper surface of the leaf is green and pubescent, sometimes with scattered glands. The underside is grayish-white, often with tints of purplish red that also appear on the leaf margins.

The flowering season of Boerhavia erecta is from early summer to mid-autumn. The inflorescences are determinatively cymose, meaning that the central, terminate flowers open before the basal flowers. Two leafy bracts subtend each branch of the inflorescence, but detach at an early stage. Each peduncle bears 2–6 sessile flowers at its apex. The flowers are tiny,  pink and cream. The corolla is bell-shaped, 5-petalled, 1.5 mm long and 2 mm wide. There are 2-3 stamens.  Anthocarps (false fruits) are circular and flat. They are 5-ribbed (0.3-0.5 mm wide) and glabrous.  The ripe fruits of this plant are sticky and adapted to dispersal by humans and animals.

Uses
Boerhavia erecta is used in traditional medicine and as a food. In West and East Africa, the leaves are eaten as a vegetable and in sauces. In the Sahel, cattle graze on its leaves.

Future studies
In December, 2003 scientists in Taiwan noticed a new species growing on the railroad of Kaoshing. After a thorough investigation, they realized that it was Boerhavia erecta, a plant species that is native in the New World. B. erecta readily invades various environments such as bush, wasteland, agricultural land, and roadsides. Although the species is highly adventive, it is not regarded as a major invasive hazard. The International Union for Conservation of Nature is working with countries such as Bangladesh to encourage the species, and its pharmacology is under study.

References

External links

erecta
Flora of Africa
Flora of Central America
Flora of North America
Flora of South America
Flora of tropical Asia
Medicinal plants of Central America
Medicinal plants of North America
Medicinal plants of South America
Plants described in 1753
Taxa named by Carl Linnaeus
Plants used in traditional African medicine